Arnold Hugh Martin Jones FBA (9 March 1904 – 9 April 1970), known as A. H. M. Jones or Hugo Jones, was a prominent 20th-century British historian of classical antiquity, particularly of the later Roman Empire.

Biography
Jones's best-known work, The Later Roman Empire, 284–602 (1964), is sometimes considered the definitive narrative history of late Rome and early Byzantium, beginning with the reign of the Roman tetrarch Diocletian and ending with that of the Byzantine emperor Maurice.  One of the most common modern criticisms of this work is its almost total reliance on literary and epigraphic primary sources, a methodology which mirrored Jones's own historiographical training.  Archaeological study of the period was in its infancy when Jones wrote, which limited the amount of material culture he could include in his research.

He published his first book, The Cities of the Eastern Roman Provinces, in 1937.  In 1946, he was appointed to the chair of the Ancient History department at University College, London.  In 1951, he moved to Cambridge University and assumed the same post there. He was elected a Fellow of the British Academy in 1947.

Jones was reportedly an extremely fast reader with an encyclopedic memory. His disdain for "small talk" sometimes made him seem remote and cold to those who did not know him well, but he was warmly regarded by his students.  He was sometimes criticized for not fully acknowledging the work of other scholars in his own footnotes, a habit he was aware of and apologized for in the preface to his first book.

Jones died of a heart attack in 1970 while travelling by boat to Thessaloniki to give a series of lectures. In 1972, John Crook published posthumously Jones' draft of The Criminal Courts of the Roman Republic and Principate.

Legacy
Since Jones' death, popular awareness of his work has often been overshadowed by the work of scholars of Late Antiquity, a period which did not exist as a separate field of study during his lifetime.  Late Antiquity scholars frequently refer to him, however, and his enormous contributions to the study of the period are widely acknowledged.

Works
 History of Abyssinia (1935)
 The Cities of the Eastern Roman Provinces (Oxford: Clarendon Press, 1937).
 The Herods of Judaea (1938) 
 The Greek City from Alexander to Justinian (1940) 
 Ancient Economic History (1948) 
 Constantine and the Conversion of Europe (1948) 
 Athenian Democracy (1957) 
 Studies in Roman Government and Law (1960) 
 The Later Roman Empire, 284–602: A Social, Economic and Administrative Survey (1964)
The Decline of the Ancient World (1966)
 Sparta (1967)
 Augustus (1970)
 The Prosopography of the Later Roman Empire, with John Robert Martindale and John Morris (1971)
The Criminal Courts of the Roman Republic and Principate (1972).

References

Further reading
A. H. M. Jones and the Later Roman Empire. Edited by David M. Gwynn. Leiden: Brill Academic Publishers, 2008 (hardback).

1904 births
1970 deaths
English classical scholars
People associated with the History Department, University College London
Members of the University of Cambridge faculty of classics
Fellows of the British Academy
20th-century British historians
Professors of Ancient History (Cambridge)
Presidents of The Roman Society